Datalog is a declarative logic programming language.  While it is syntactically a subset of Prolog, Datalog generally uses a bottom-up rather than top-down evaluation model.  This difference yields significantly different behavior and properties from Prolog.  It is often used as a query language for deductive databases. Datalog has been applied to problems in data integration, networking, program analysis, and more.

Example 

A Datalog program consists of facts, which are statements that are held to be true, and rules, which say how to deduce new facts from known facts. For example, here are two facts that mean xerces is a parent of brooke and brooke is a parent of damocles:
parent(xerces, brooke).
parent(brooke, damocles).
The names are written in lowercase because strings beginning with an uppercase letter stand for variables. Here are two rules:
ancestor(X, Y) :- parent(X, Y).
ancestor(X, Y) :- parent(X, Z), ancestor(Z, Y).
The :- symbol is read as "if", and the comma is read "and", so these rules mean:
 X is an ancestor of Y if X is a parent of Y.
 X is an ancestor of Y if X is a parent of some Z, and Z is an ancestor of Y.

The meaning of a program is defined to be the set of all of the facts that can be deduced using the initial facts and the rules. This program's meaning is given by the following facts:
parent(xerces, brooke).
parent(brooke, damocles).
ancestor(xerces, brooke).
ancestor(brooke, damocles).
ancestor(xerces, damocles).

Some Datalog implementations don't deduce all possible facts, but instead answer queries:
?- ancestor(xerces, X).
This query asks: Who are all the X that xerces is an ancestor of? For this example, it would return brooke and damocles.

Comparison to relational databases 

The non-recursive subset of Datalog is closely related to query languages for relational databases, such as SQL. The following table maps between Datalog, relational algebra, and SQL concepts:

More formally, non-recursive Datalog corresponds precisely to unions of conjunctive queries, or equivalently, negation-free relational algebra.

s(x, y).
t(y).
r(A, B) :- s(A, B), t(B).

CREATE TABLE s (
  z0 TEXT NONNULL,
  z1 TEXT NONNULL,
  PRIMARY KEY (z0, z1)
);
CREATE TABLE t (
  z0 TEXT NONNULL PRIMARY KEY
);
INSERT INTO s VALUES ('x', 'y');
INSERT INTO t VALUES ('y');
CREATE VIEW r AS
SELECT s.z0, s.z1
FROM s, t
WHERE s.z1 = t.z0;

Syntax 

A Datalog program consists of a list of rules (Horn clauses). If constant and variable are two countable sets of constants and variables respectively and relation is a countable set of predicate symbols, then the following BNF grammar expresses the structure of a Datalog program:

<program> ::= <rule> <program> | ""
<rule> ::= <atom> ":-" <atom-list> "."
<atom> ::= <relation> "(" <term-list> ")"
<atom-list> ::= <atom> | <atom> "," <atom-list> | ""
<term> ::= <constant> | <variable>
<term-list> ::= <term> | <term> "," <term-list> | ""

Every Datalog program must satisfy the condition that every variable that appears in the head of a rule also appears in the body (this condition is sometimes called the ).

There are two common conventions for variable names: capitalizing variables, or prefixing them with a question mark ?.

Note that under this definition, Datalog does  include negation nor aggregates; see  for more information about those constructs.

Rules with empty bodies are called . For example, the following rule is a fact:
r(x) :- .

Syntactic sugar 

Many implementations of logic programming extend the above grammar to allow writing facts without the :-, like so:

r(x).

Some also allow writing 0-ary relations without parentheses, like so:

p :- q.

These are merely abbreviations (syntactic sugar); they have no impact on the semantics of the program.

Semantics 

There are three widely-used approaches to the semantics of Datalog programs: model-theoretic, fixed-point, and proof-theoretic. These three approaches can be proven equivalent.

An atom is called  if none of its subterms are variables. Intuitively, each of the semantics define the meaning of a program to be the set of all ground atoms that can be deduced from the rules of the program, starting from the facts.

Model theoretic 

A rule is called ground if all of its atoms (head and body) are ground. A ground rule R1 is a ground instance of another rule R2 if R1 is the result of a substitution of constants for all the variables in R2. The Herbrand base of a Datalog program is the set of all ground atoms that can be made with the constants appearing in the program. The  of a Datalog program is the smallest subset of the Herbrand base such that, for each ground instance of each rule in the program, if the atoms in the body of the rule are in the set, then so is the head. The model-theoretic semantics define the minimal Herbrand model to be the meaning of the program.

Fixed-point 

The fixpoint semantics suggest an algorithm for computing the minimal model: Start with the set of ground facts in the program, then repeatedly add consequences of the rules until a fixpoint is reached. This algorithm is called naïve evaluation.

Proof-theoretic 

The proof-theoretic semantics defines the meaning of a Datalog program to be the set of facts with corresponding proof trees. Intuitively, a proof tree shows how to derive a fact from the facts and rules of a program.

One might be interested in knowing whether or not a particular ground atom appears in the minimal Herbrand model of a Datalog program, perhaps without caring much about the rest of the model. A top-down reading of the proof trees described above suggests an algorithm for computing the results of such queries. This reading informs the SLD resolution algorithm, which forms the basis for the evaluation of Prolog.

Evaluation 

There are many different ways to evaluate a Datalog program, with different performance characteristics.

Bottom-up evaluation strategies 

Bottom-up evaluation strategies start with the facts in the program and repeatedly apply the rules until the either some goal or query is established, or until the complete minimal model of the program is produced.

Naïve evaluation 

Naïve evaluation mirrors the fixpoint semantics for Datalog programs. Naïve evaluation uses a set of "known facts", which is initialized to the facts in the program. It proceeds by repeatedly enumerating all ground instances of each rule in the program. If each atom in the body of the ground instance is in the set of known facts, then the head atom is added to the set of known facts. This process is repeated until a fixed point is reached, and no more facts may be deduced. Naïve evaluation produces the entire minimal model of the program.

Semi-naïve evaluation 

Semi-naïve evaluation is a bottom-up evaluation strategy that can be asymptotically faster than naïve evaluation.

Performance considerations 

Naïve and semi-naïve evaluation both evaluate recursive Datalog rules by repeatedly applying them to a set of known facts until a fixed point is reached. In each iteration, rules are only run for "one step", i.e., non-recursively. As mentioned above, each non-recursive Datalog rule corresponds precisely to a conjunctive query. Therefore, many of the techniques from database theory used to speed up conjunctive queries are applicable to bottom-up evaluation of Datalog, such as

 Index selection and data structures (hash table, B-tree, etc.)
 Query optimization, especially join order
 Join algorithms

Many such techniques are implemented in modern bottom-up Datalog engines such as Soufflé. Some Datalog engines integrate SQL databases directly.

Bottom-up evaluation of Datalog is also amenable to parallization. Parallel Datalog engines are generally divided into two paradigms:

 In the shared-memory, multi-core setting, Datalog engines execute on a single node. Coordination between threads may be achieved using locking or lock-free data structures. Examples include Datalog engines using OpenMP.

 In the shared-nothing setting, Datalog engines execute on a cluster of nodes. Such engines generally operate by splitting relations into disjoint subsets based on a hash function, performing computations (joins) on each node, and then exchanging newly-generated tuples over the network. Examples include Datalog engines based on MPI, Hadoop, and Spark.

Top-down evaluation strategies 

SLD resolution is sound and complete for Datalog programs.

Magic sets 

Top-down evaluation strategies begin with a query or goal. Bottom-up evaluation strategies can answer queries by computing the entire minimal model and matching the query against it, but this can be inefficient if the answer only depends on a small subset of the entire model. The magic sets algorithm takes a Datalog program and a query, and produces a more efficient program that computes the same answer to the query while still using bottom-up evaluation. A variant of the magic sets algorithm has been shown to produce programs that, when evaluated using semi-naïve evaluation, are as efficient as top-down evaluation.

Complexity 

In this formulation, there are three variations of the computational complexity of evaluating Datalog programs:

With respect to data complexity, the decision problem for Datalog is P-complete. With respect to program complexity, the decision problem is EXPTIME-complete. In particular, evaluating Datalog programs always terminates; Datalog is not Turing-complete.

Some extensions to Datalog do not preserve these complexity bounds. Extensions implemented in some Datalog engines Datalog engines, such as algebraic data types, can even make the resulting language Turing-complete.

Extensions 

Several extensions have been made to Datalog, e.g., to support negation, aggregate functions, inequalities, to allow object-oriented programming, or to allow disjunctions as heads of clauses. These extensions have significant impacts on the language's semantics and on the implementation of a corresponding interpreter.

Datalog is a syntactic subset of Prolog, disjunctive Datalog, answer set programming, Datalogℤ, and constraint logic programming. When evaluated as an answer set program, a Datalog program yields a single answer set, which is exactly its minimal model.

Many implementations of Datalog extend Datalog with additional features; see  for more information.

Aggregation 

Datalog can be extended to support aggregate functions.

Notable Datalog engines that implement aggregation include:

 LogicBlox
 Soufflé

Negation 

Adding negation to Datalog complicates its semantics, leading to whole new languages and strategies for evaluation. For example, the language that results from adding negation with the stable model semantics is exactly answer set programming.

Stratified negation can be added to Datalog while retaining its model-theoretic and fixed point semantics. Notable Datalog engines that implement stratified negation include:

 LogicBlox
 Soufflé

Comparison to Prolog 

Unlike in Prolog, statements of a Datalog program can be stated in any order. Datalog does not have Prolog's cut operator. This makes Datalog a fully declarative language.

In contrast to Prolog, Datalog
 disallows complex terms as arguments of predicates, e.g., p(x, y) is admissible but not p(f(x), y),
 disallows negation,
 requires that every variable that appears in the head of a clause also appear in a literal in the body of the clause.

This article deals primarily with Datalog without negation (see also ). However, stratified negation is a common addition to Datalog; the following list contrasts Prolog with Datalog with stratified negation. Datalog with stratified negation

 also disallows complex terms as arguments of predicates,
 requires that every variable that appears in the head of a clause also appear in a positive (i.e., not negated) atom in the body of the clause,
 requires that every variable appearing in a negative literal in the body of a clause also appear in some positive literal in the body of the clause.

Expressiveness 

In other words, this question asks whether the Datalog program could be rewritten as a nonrecursive Datalog program. Solving the boundedness problem on arbitrary Datalog programs is undecidable, but it can be made decidable by restricting to some fragments of Datalog.

Datalog engines 

Datalog engines often implement extensions of Datalog, extending it with additional data types, foreign function interfaces, or support for user-defined lattices. Such extensions may allow for writing non-terminating or otherwise ill-defined programs.

Uses and influence 

Datalog is quite limited in its expressivity. It is not Turing-complete, and doesn't include basic data types such as integers or strings. This parsimony is appealing from a theoretical standpoint, but it means Datalog per se is rarely used as a programming language. Most Datalog engines implement substantial extensions of Datalog. However, Datalog has a strong influence on such implementations, and many authors don't bother to distinguish them from Datalog as presented in this article. Accordingly, the applications discussed in this section include applications of realistic implementations of Datalog-based languages.

Datalog has been applied to problems in data integration, information extraction, networking, security, cloud computing and machine learning. Google has developed an extension to Datalog for big data processing.

Datalog has seen application in static program analysis. The Soufflé dialect has been used to write pointer analyses for Java and a control-flow analysis for Scheme. Datalog has been integrated with SMT solvers to make it easier to write certain static analyses. The Flix dialect is also suited to writing static program analyses.

Some widely used database systems include ideas and algorithms developed for Datalog. For example, the SQL:1999 standard includes recursive queries, and the Magic Sets algorithm (initially developed for the faster evaluation of Datalog queries) is implemented in IBM's DB2.

History 

The origins of Datalog date back to the beginning of logic programming, but it became prominent as a separate area around 1977 when Hervé Gallaire and Jack Minker organized a workshop on logic and databases. David Maier is credited with coining the term Datalog.

See also 
 Answer set programming
 Conjunctive query
 Datalogℤ
 Disjunctive Datalog
 Flix
 SWRL
 Tuple-generating dependency (TGD), a language for integrity constraints on relational databases with a similar syntax to Datalog

Notes

References 

Query languages
Logic programming languages
Declarative programming languages